Musatovo (Mösät) is a rural locality (a village) in Yangatausky Selsoviet, Salavatsky District, Bashkortostan, Russia. The population was 71 as of 2010. There are 4 streets.

Geography 
Musatovo is located 37 km north of Maloyaz (the district's administrative centre) by road. Urdaly is the nearest rural locality.

References 

Rural localities in Salavatsky District